Palm Beach County Glades Airport , also known as Pahokee Airport, is a county-owned, public-use airport in Palm Beach County, Florida, United States. It is located three nautical miles (6 km) southwest of the central business district of Pahokee, Florida. The airport is owned by Palm Beach County and operated by the Palm Beach County Airports Department. It is included in the National Plan of Integrated Airport Systems for 2011–2015, which categorized it as a general aviation facility.

History 
In 2004, Hurricane Frances and Hurricane Jeanne destroyed the airport's main building, causing operations to be conducted from a trailer. In 2009, new buildings were dedicated, including a  office/lobby, a  main hangar, and a building containing 10 rental hangars.

Facilities and aircraft 
Palm Beach County Glades Airport covers an area of 243 acres (98 ha) at an elevation of 16 feet (5 m) above mean sea level. It has one runway designated 17/35 with an asphalt surface measuring 4,116 by 75 feet (1,255 x 23 m).

For the 12-month period ending January 14, 2010, the airport had 36,750 aircraft operations, an average of 100 per day: 99% general aviation and 1% air taxi. At that time there were 26 aircraft based at this airport: 19% single-engine, 8% multi-engine, 15% helicopter, and 58% ultralight.

The airport, commonly referred to as "Pahokee", does not have a control tower. Pilots landing at Pahokee use self-announce procedures to notify other aircraft of take-offs and landings.  The airport can handle aircraft with a single-wheel weight of up to 20,000 pounds (9,071 kg) although local regulations restrict aircraft to 12,500 pounds (5,670 kg) and under.  Because of the VOR/DME systems and relatively low traffic, this airport is one of five South Florida airports that is used for instrument training by student pilots.

The airport's fixed-base operator (FBO) is Landmark Aviation. The former FBO was Pahokee Aviation, Inc.

Environmental concerns 
Due to environmental considerations of the Florida everglades ecosystem, water drainage is strictly regulated by the East Shore Water Control District.  Excess water drains from the Airport onto Closter Farms, located adjacent to the airport.  The County compensates Closter Farms for drainage services that Closter's provides to take care of the excess drainage.

Accidents and incidents
 On March 8, 2019, a Piper PA-23 aircraft crashed into Lake Okeechobee while on approach to the airport. Five people were killed.

References

External links 
  brochure from CFASPP
 Aerial image as of March 1996 from USGS The National Map
 Landmark Aviation—PHK, the fixed-base operator (FBO)
 

Airports in Palm Beach County, Florida